Reginald Cooray (12 November 1947 – 13 January 2023) was a Sri Lankan teacher and politician. He was a provincial chief minister, a government minister, and governor of the Northern Province. He was briefly governor of the Central Province in April 2018, his tenure lasting less than 24 hours, making it the shortest of any governorship in Sri Lankan history.

Personal life and death
Cooray was born on 12 November 1947. He was a Roman Catholic and a wealthy land owner. Cooray's wife died in July 2011. His daughter Muditha Sanjeewani died in December 2013.

Cooray died of a heart attack on 13 January 2023, aged 75.

Career 
Cooray was an English teacher by profession. He started his political career in Janatha Vimukthi Peramuna (JVP). He contested the 1977 parliamentary election as an independent candidate in Beruwala but failed to get elected. He later joined Vijaya Kumaratunga's Sri Lanka People's Party (SLPP).

In 1988, the Communist Party, Lanka Sama Samaja Party, Nava Sama Samaja Party and SLPP formed the United Socialist Alliance (USA). Cooray was a member of the first and second Western Provincial Council (WPC). Cooray was one of the USA's candidates in Kalutara District in the 1989 parliamentary election but the USA failed to win any seats in the district. In 1993 the USA and Sri Lanka Freedom Party (SLFP) formed the People's Alliance (PA). Cooray was one of the PA's candidates in Kalutara District at the 1994 parliamentary election. He was elected and entered Parliament. He was re-elected in the 2000 parliamentary election. He was appointed Minister of Ethnic Affairs and National Integration after the election. However, shortly afterwards he was appointed to the WPC and on 9 November 2000 he became Chief Minister of the Western Province.

On 20 January 2004 the SLFP and the JVP formed the United People's Freedom Alliance (UPFA). Cooray contested the 2004 parliamentary election as one of the UPFA's candidates in Kalutara District and was re-elected to Parliament. He was appointed Minister of Information and Media after the election.

Cooray contested the 2004 provincial council election as one of the UPFA's candidates in Kalutara District and was elected to the WPC. Cooray was accused of accepting bribes from private operators in return for bus route permits and of nepotism. Facing a no-confidence motion over corruption and abuse of power, Cooray resigned in June 2005. A few days later he was re-appointed Chief Minister. He was re-elected at the 2009 provincial council election but lost his chief ministerial position.

Cooray contested the 2010 parliamentary election as one of the UPFA's candidates in Kalutara District and was re-elected to Parliament. He was appointed Deputy Minister of Justice after the election. He was appointed Minister of Minor Export Promotion in November 2010. He lost his cabinet position following the 2015 presidential election but a few days after the election he pledged his support for newly-elected President Maithripala Sirisena. In March 2015 Cooray was questioned by the Commission to Investigate Allegations of Bribery or Corruption (CIABOC). A few days later, when the SLFP joined the national government, he was appointed Minister of Aviation. Cooray did not contest the 2015 parliamentary election for financial reasons. He was however placed on the UPFA's list of National List candidates. However, after the election he was not appointed to the National List.

Cooray was appointed Governor of Northern Province in February 2016. On 12 April 2018, he was sworn in as Governor of the Central Province. Less than 24 hours later on the morning of the 13th, he was sworn in as Governor of the Northern Province, and his governorship of the Central Province revoked, going to P. B. Dissanayake. The revocation has been attributed to an objection by senior Buddhist clergy from the Central Province on the basis of Cooray's Catholic faith and non-Govigama caste.

Electoral history

References 

1947 births
2023 deaths
Chief Ministers of Western Province, Sri Lanka
Cabinet ministers of Sri Lanka
Deputy ministers of Sri Lanka
Governors of Northern Province, Sri Lanka
Members of the 10th Parliament of Sri Lanka
Members of the 11th Parliament of Sri Lanka
Members of the 13th Parliament of Sri Lanka
Members of the 14th Parliament of Sri Lanka
Sinhalese politicians
Sinhalese teachers
Sri Lanka Freedom Party politicians
Sri Lankan Roman Catholics
United People's Freedom Alliance politicians
Alumni of St. Sebastian's College, Moratuwa